A Balinese Trance Seance is a 1979 documentary film by ethnographic filmmaker Tim Asch and anthropologist Linda Connor that profiles Jero Tapakan, a Balinese spirit medium. It was one of five films that were made with Jero Tapakan and were considered to be exemplary ethnographic films.

The film was the first in the series; the later films were: Jero on Jero: "A Balinese Trance Seance" Observed (1981), The Medium is the Masseuse: A Balinese Massage (1983), and Jero Tapakan: Stories From the Life of a Balinese Healer (1983).

Notes

Further reading
 Linda Connor, Patsy Asch and Timothy Asch (1986) Jero Tapakan: Balinese Healer. An Ethnographic Film Monograph. Monograph No. 9, Ethnographics Press, Los Angeles: University of Southern California, (1986) 1996 2nd Edition. .

External links
A Balinese Trance Seance
 

1979 films
Indonesian documentary films
American documentary films
Anthropology documentary films
Documentary films about religion
Films directed by Timothy Asch
Films shot in Indonesia
1979 documentary films
1970s English-language films
1970s American films